Rashid Gumarovich Nurgaliyev (born 1956) is a Russian general and politician who served as Russia's interior minister from 2003 to 2012.

Early life and education
Nurgaliyev was born in Zhetikara, Kazakh SSR, on 8 October 1956 and is of Volga Tatar ethnicity. He graduated from Kuusinen State University in Petrozavodsk in 1979. He later received a doctoral degree in economics. His thesis was on the “economic aspects of the formation of business undertakings in modern Russia".

Career

From 1981 to 1995, he worked in the KGB Directorate of Karelia and its successor, Security Ministry of Karelia, in 1992-1994 led by Nikolai Patrushev.

In 1995, he moved to Moscow and was appointed chief inspector of the Inspectorial Directorate of FSK (FSB) and head of a section of FSB Internal Security Department led by Nikolai Patrushev.

In 2002, he became first deputy minister of interior of Russia. In 2003, he became minister of the MVD. He was removed from office on 21 May 2012 and Vladimir Kolokoltsev replaced him in the post. Two days after his dismissal he was made deputy secretary of the Security Council on 23 May.

He holds the rank of Army General.

In February 2023, by decree of President Putin, Nurgaliyev was appointed First Deputy Secretary of the Russian Security Council.

Personal life
Nurgaliyev is married and has two children. He is an Orthodox Christian.

Honours and awards
 Order of Merit for the Fatherland, 3rd and 4th classes
 Order of Honour
 Order of Saint Righteous Grand Duke Dmitry Donskoy, 1st class (2005, Russian Orthodox Church)
 Order of Akhmad Kadyrov (2006, Chechen Republic)
 Honorary Citizen of the Republic of Karelia
 Yuri Andropov Award
 Medal "In Commemoration of the 1000th Anniversary of Kazan"
 Medal for Distinction in Military Service, 2nd class
 Medal of Merit in the conduct of national census
 Jubilee Medal "100 Years of the Trans-Siberian Railway"
 Medal "In Commemoration of the 300th Anniversary of Saint Petersburg"
 Jubilee Medal "70 Years of the Armed Forces of the USSR"
 Medal for Strengthening Military Cooperation(Defence)
 Medal "200 Years of the Ministry of Defence"
 Medal "For Military Merit" (MIA)
 Medal "For Impeccable Service", 1st class

References

External links 

Information on Nurgaliyev on the site of the Russian ministry of the interior
 Biography
 Biography

1956 births
Living people
Volga Tatar people
Tatar people of Russia
Interior ministers of Russia
KGB officers
Generals of the army (Russia)
Recipients of the Order "For Merit to the Fatherland", 3rd class
Recipients of the Order of Honour (Russia)
Recipients of the Order of Saint Righteous Grand Duke Dmitry Donskoy, 1st class
Tatar politicians
Russian individuals subject to European Union sanctions
Russian individuals subject to the U.S. Department of the Treasury sanctions